Coleophora asperginella is a moth of the family Coleophoridae. It is found in Turkestan and southern Russia. It occurs in desert biotopes.

Adults are on wing in August.

The larvae feed on Climacopiera species and Corispermum aralo-caspicum. They create a combined case. The caudal part has a membrane of fruit, while the cephalic part consists of leaf pieces. The valve is three-sided but also somewhat flat. The length of the case is 7–8 mm and it is greenish-brown in color. Larvae can be found from May to June.

References

asperginella
Moths described in 1872
Moths of Europe
Moths of Asia